Conta-me como foi is a Portuguese television drama series which has been broadcast on RTP1 of Rádio e Televisão de Portugal from 2007 to 2011 and since 2019. It recounts the experiences of a middle-class family, the Lopes, during the last years of the Estado Novo.

Development
The first episode was broadcast on 22 April 2007. The series begins in March 1968 with the arrival of television to the house of the Lopes just in time to watch the Festival da Canção 1968. The last episode of the fifth season was broadcast on 25 April 2011 with the Lopes living the Carnation Revolution on 25 April 1974.

In February 2019, RTP announced that the series, after eight years shelved, would be renewed for 52 more episodes, with the storyline moving firmly into the 1980s. The first episode of the sixth season was broadcast on 7 December 2019 with the Lopes entering 1984.

The series is an adaptation of Cuéntame cómo pasó, a Spanish series by Televisión Española starring Imanol Arias and Ana Duato.

Plot 
António Lopes (Miguel Guilherme) and Margarida Marques (Rita Blanco) are a married couple that have emigrated in the 1960s from Ermidão, a (fictional) small village inland, to a (also fictional) working-class suburb in Lisbon, along with her mother Hermínia and their three children, Isabel, Tóni and Carlos seeking a better life away from the hardships of an impoverished countryside. António works as a clerk at the Ministry of Finance in the mornings and at Eng. Ramires' (José Raposo) printing house in the afternoons. Margarida and Hermínia make trousers for a department store at home while doing the housekeeping. Isabel works at Clara's (Maria João Abreu) hair salon along with Náni, Tóni is starting a master's degree in Law making him the first Lopes going to university and Carlos spends his school days with his best friends Marinho (Manuel Alves) and Luís (Francisco Madeira). With great effort and hard work they are able to purchase in installments their first television set, their first washing machine and even their first car.

The Lopes' story is narrated from an indefinite present by an adult Carlos (voiced by ). Their story is directly and indirectly affected by the events and the social, economical and political changes occurring in Portugal since the late 1960s until the early 1980s. The Lopes are also direct and indirect witness of the historic acts occurring those days.

Cast and characters

Lopes Family

Episodes

References

Further reading 
 
 

Portuguese historical television series
Rádio e Televisão de Portugal original programming
2007 Portuguese television series debuts
2000s Portuguese television series
2010s Portuguese television series
2020s Portuguese television series
Television series set in the 1960s
Television series set in the 1970s
Television series set in the 1980s
Non-Spanish television series based on Spanish television series
Portuguese television series based on non-Portuguese television series
Television shows filmed in Portugal